This is a list of the kings and queens of Pamplona, later Navarre. Pamplona was the primary name of the kingdom until its union with Aragon (1076–1134). However, the territorial designation Navarre came into use as an alternative name in the late tenth century, and the name Pamplona was retained well into the twelfth century.

House of Íñiguez, 824?–905
The Íñiguez dynasty are credited with founding the Navarrese kingdom (of Pamplona) in or around 824 when they are said to have risen against an attempt to extend Frankish (Carolingian) authority into the region. The Cordoban sources referred to them as sometimes-rebellious vassals, rather than in the manner used to refer to the Christian realms outside their control. They were supplanted in 905 when an anti-Cordoba coalition placed the succeeding Jiménez dynasty in power.

House of Jiménez, 905–1234
In 905, a coalition of neighbors forced Fortún Garcés to retire to a monastery, and enthroned in his place a scion of a new dynasty. Under their reign, the name Navarre began to supplant that of Pamplona.

|-
| Sancho I Garcés905–925|| ||son of García Jiménez and Dadildis de Pallars||Toda of Navarre6 children||11 December 925Resa
|-
|Jimeno Garcés925–931|| ||son of García Jiménez and Dadildis de Pallars||Sancha of Navarre3 children||29 May 931
|-
|García Sánchez I931–970|| ||919son of Sancho I Garcés and Toda of Navarre||Andregota Galíndez of Aragón2 childrenTeresa Ramírez of León3 children||22 February 970aged 51
|-
|Sancho II Garcés Abarca970–994||||after 935son of García Sánchez I and Andregota||Urraca Fernández4 children||December 994
|-
|García Sánchez II994–1000/04|| ||son of Sancho II Garcés Abarca and Urraca Fernández||Jimena Fernández of Cea9814 children||1000/04
|-
|Sancho III the Great1004–1035|| ||985son of García Sánchez II and Jimena Fernández of Cea||Muniadona of Castile10104 children||18 October 1035
|-
|García Sánchez III1035–1054|| ||1016son of Sancho III the Great and Muniadona of Castile||Estefanía of Barcelona10389 children||15 September 1054Atapuerca
|-
|Sancho IV Garcés1054–1076|| ||1039son of García Sánchez III and Estefanía of Barcelona||Placencia 10683 children||4 June 1076Peñalén
|-
|}

With the assassination of Sancho IV, Navarre was partitioned by his cousins Alfonso VI of Castile and Sancho Ramírez of Aragón, and the latter made king, leading to more than half a century of Aragonese control.

|-
|Sancho V Ramírez1076–1094||||1042son of Ramiro I of Aragón and Ermesinde of Bigorre||Isabel of Urgel10651 childFelicia of Roucy10763 children||4 June 1094Huescaaged approximately 52
|-
|Peter1094–1104||||1068son of Sancho Ramírez, King of Aragón and Navarre and Isabella of Urgel||Agnes of Aquitaine10862 childrenBertha of Aragón1097No children||28 September 1104Aran Valleyaged approximately 36
|-
|Alfonso I the Battler1104–1134||||1073son of Sancho Ramírez, King of Aragón and Navarre and Felicia of Roucy||Urraca of Castile1109No children||8 September 1134Huescaaged approximately 61
|-
|}

The death of Alfonso led to a succession crisis in Aragón and the nobles of Navarre took advantage to reestablish an independent monarchy, crowning a grandnephew (through an illegitimate brother) of the assassinated Sancho IV.

|-
|García Ramírez the Restorer1134–1150||||son of Ramiro Sánchez of Monzón and Cristina Rodríguez||Marguerite de l'Aigle11304 childrenUrraca of Castile24 June 11442 children||21 November 1150Lorca
|-
|Sancho VI the Wise1150–1194||||1133son of García Ramírez and Marguerite de l'Aigle||Sancha of Castile11576 children||27 June 1194Pamplona
|-
|Sancho VII the Strong1194–1234||||1157Tudelason of Sancho VI of Navarre and Sancha of Castile||Constance of Toulouse1195No childrenClemence (of Hohenstaufen?)aft. 12011 son||7 April 1234Tudela
|-
|}

House of Champagne, 1234–1284

The death of Sancho VII, the last of the Jiménez kings, led to the crown of Navarre being inherited by the son of his sister Blanche, Countess of Champagne, she having been regent during much of her brother's reign.

|-
|Theobald I the Posthumous1234–1253||||30 May 1201Troyesson of Theobald III of Champagne and Blanche of Navarre||Gertrude of Dagsburg1220No childrenAgnes of Beaujeu12221 childMargaret of Bourbon12326 children||8 July 1253Pamplonaaged 52
|-
|Theobald II the Young1253–1270||||1238son of Theobald I of Navarre and Margaret of Bourbon||Isabelle of France6 April 1255No children||4 December 1270Trapaniaged 32
|-
|Henry I the Fat1270–1274||||1244son of Theobald I of Navarre and Margaret of Bourbon||Blanche of Artois12692 children||22 July 1274aged 30
|-
|Joan I1274–1305||||14 January 1271Bar-sur-Seinedaughter of Henry I of Navarre and Blanche of Artois||Philip IV of France16 August 12847 children||4 April 1305Château de Vincennesaged 34
|-
|}

Capetian dynasty, 1284–1441

House of Capet, 1284–1349

Henry's unexpected death left his infant daughter Joan as the only heir to the throne. Joan's mother Blanche of Artois served as regent for the next ten years. In 1284 Joan was married to the future Philip IV of France, ending Blanche's regency. Philip assumed the throne of France a year later as "King of France and Navarre".

|-
|Philip I the FairPhilip IV of France1284–1305||||1268Fontainebleauson of Philip III of France and Isabella of Aragon||Joan I of Navarre16 August 12847 children||29 November 1314Fontainebleauaged 46||By the right of his wife, Joan I
|-
|Louis I the QuarrellerLouis X of France1305–1316||||4 October 1289Parisson of Philip IV of France and Joan I of Navarre||Margaret of Burgundy21 September 13051 childClementia of Hungary19 August 13151 child||5 June 1316Vincennesaged 26||By the right of his mother, Joan I
|-
|John I the Posthumousof France1316||||15 November 1316Parisson of Louis X of France and Clementia of Hungary||never married||20 November 1316Paris5 days||By the right of his father, Louis X
|-
|Philip II the TallPhilip V of France1316–1322||||1292Lyonson of Philip IV of France and Joan I of Navarre||Joan II, Countess of Burgundy13077 children||3 January 1322Longchampaged 29||By the right of his mother, Joan I
|-
|Charles I the Fair Charles IV of France1322–1328||||19 June 1294Clermontson of Philip IV of France and Joan I of Navarre||Blanche of Burgundy13072 childrenMarie of Luxembourg13222 childrenJeanne d'Évreux13253 children||1 February 1328Vincennesaged 34||By the right of his mother, Joan I
|-
|Joan II1328–1349||||28 January 1312Charenton-le-Pontdaughter of Louis X of France and Margaret of Burgundy||Philip III of Navarre8 children||6 October 1349Charenton-le-Pontaged 37||
 By the right of her father, Louis X
 By the right of the invitation of the general assembly
|-
|}

House of Évreux, 1328–1441

After the deaths of Louis and his infant son John, his brothers Philip and Charles held the crowns of France and Navarre until their own deaths. At that time, the crown of France passed to Philip of Valois, a distant cousin who was not descended from Joan I, and the crown of Navarre was allowed to pass to Louis' daughter Joan II, despite her presumed illegitimacy. Joan reigned together with her husband Philip III until his death, and then alone until her own death. 

|-
|Philip III the Wise(jure uxoris)1328–1343||||27 March 1306son of Louis count of Evreux and Margaret of Artois||Joan II of Navarre8 children||16 September 1343Jerez de la Fronteraaged 37
|-
|Charles II the Bad1349–1387||||10 October 1332Évreuxson of Philip III of Navarre and Joan II of Navarre||Joan of France7 children||1 January 1387Pamplonaaged 54
|-
|Charles III the Noble1387–1425||||22 July 1361Nantesson of Charles II of Navarre and Joan of France||Eleanor of Castile13758 children||8 September 1425Oliteaged 64
|-
|Blanche Ι1425–1441||||1387Castiledaughter of Charles III of Navarre and Eleanor of Castile||Martin I of Sicily26 December 14021 childJohn II of Aragon10 June 14204 children||3 April 1441Santa María la Real de Nievaaged 56
|-
|}

House of Trastámara, 1425–1479

Blanche I reigned together with her husband John II. In 1458, John additionally inherited the crown of Aragon from his older brother; after his death, the Navarrese crown was given to Eleanor, the only living child of him and Blanche, while his Aragonese crown was given to Ferdinand II of Aragon, son of John and his second wife Juana Enríquez. 

|-
|John II the Great1425–1441 (jure uxoris)1425–1479 (de facto)||||29 June 1397Medina del Camposon of Ferdinand I and Eleanor of Alburquerque||Blanche6 November 14194 childrenJuana Enríquez2 children||20 January 1479Barcelonaaged 81
|-
|Eleanor1479||||2 February 1425Olite daughter of John II of Aragon and Blanche||Gaston IV, Count of Foix11 children||12 February 1479Tudelaaged 54
|-
|}

Claimants
After Blanche's death in 1441, John retained the crown of Navarre for himself until he died 38 years later, keeping it from his son and elder daughter, Charles IV and Blanche II. Conflict with his son led to the Navarrese Civil War. Though some of the sources regard Charles and Blanche as the legitimate monarchs, the de facto king of Navarre was still John II. Eleanor didn't claim to be the queen until her father's death.

|-
|Charles IV1441–1461 (de jure, titular)||||29 May 1421Peñafielson of John II of Aragon and Blanche I of Navarre||Agnes of Cleves No children||23 September 1461Barcelonaaged 40
|-
|Blanche II1461–1464 (de jure, titular)||||1424Olite daughter of John II of Aragon and Blanche I of Navarre||Henry IV of CastileNo children ||2 December 1464Orthezaged 40
|-
|}

House of Foix, 1479–1517

Eleanor, who had allied with her father against her brother and sister, outlived her father by only three weeks. By that time she was the widow of Gaston IV, Count of Foix, and their oldest son Gaston of Foix, Prince of Viana had also died. She was thus succeeded by her grandson Francis. 

|-
|Francis Phoebus1479–1483|||||12 April 1467son of Gaston of Foix, Prince of Viana, and Magdalena of Valois||never married||12 February 1483Pauaged 16
|-
|Catherine1483–1517||||1468 daughter of Gaston of Foix, Prince of Viana, and Magdalena of Valois||John III of Navarre13 children||12 February 1517Mont-de-Marsanaged 49
|-
|}

House of Albret, 1484–1516
Catherine reigned together with her husband John III. After his death, she reigned alone for eight months until her own death. During their reign, Navarre was defeated by Ferdinand II of Aragon in 1512, resulting in the loss of all its territory south of the Pyrenees, including the royal capital of Pamplona. Ferdinand, the son of John II and his second wife and thus the half-brother of Catherine's grandmother Eleanor, was then crowned King of Navarre, and that branch of the title descended through the Aragonese and Spanish monarchs. Catherine and John III were left with Lower Navarre, that small fraction of the kingdom's former territory that is on the north side of the Pyrenees, which was united with other lands in France that were under their control.

|-
|John III(jure uxoris)1484–1516||||1469 son of Alain I of Albret and Francoise of Châtillon-Limoges||Catherine of Navarre13 children||14 June 1516Pauaged 47
|-
|}

House of Trastamara, 1512–1516

|-
|Ferdinand I1512–1516||||1452 son of John II of Navarre and Juana Enríquez||Isabella I of Castile5 children||23 January 1516Madrigalejoaged 63
|-
|}

Division of Kingdom

Lower Navarre 
In 1530, Charles V decided to renounce definitively any claim to Lower Navarre due to the impossibility of controlling it, and because it was being effectively ruled by Henry II. However, Charles V and his mother Joana III continued as kings in Upper Navarre.

Catherine and John III were left with that small fraction of the kingdom's former territory that is on the north side of the Pyrenees, which was united with other lands in France that were under their control.

House of Albret, 1517–1572 

|Henry II1517–1555||||18 April 1503Sangüesa son of John III of Navarre and Catherine of Navarre||Margaret of Angoulême15262 children||25 May 1555Hagetmauaged 52
|-
|Joan III1555–1572||||16 November 1528Saint-Germain-en-Laye daughter of Henry II of Navarre and Margaret of Angoulême||Antoine of Navarre20 October 15485 children||9 June 1572Parisaged 43
|-
|}

House of Bourbon, 1572–1620 
Jeanne III reigned together with her husband Antoine until his death, and then alone until her own death. Their son Henry became King of France in 1589, taking possession of the kingdom in 1593 as the French Wars of Religion came to a close. Thereafter the crown of Navarre passed to the kings of France. In 1620, the Kingdom was merged into France; however, the French kings continued to use the title King of Navarre until 1791, and it was revived again from 1814 to 1830 during the Bourbon Restoration.

|-
|Antoine(jure uxoris)1555–1562||||22 April 1518La Fère, Picardy son of Charles, Duke of Vendôme, and Françoise of Alençon||Joan III of Navarre20 October 15485 children||17 November 1562Les Andelys, Eureaged 44
|-
|Henry III the GreatHenry IV of France1572–1610||||13 December 1553Pau son of Antoine of Navarre and Joan III of Navarre||(1) Margaret of France18 August 1572no issues(2) Marie de' Medici17 December 16006 children||14 May 1610Parisaged 56
|-
|Louis II the JustLouis XIII of France1610–1620||||27 September 1601Château de Fontainebleau son of Henry IV of France and Marie de' Medici||Anne of Spain24 November 16156 children||14 May 1643Parisaged 41
|-
|}

Titular Rulers of Navarre, 1620–1830 

|-
|Louis II the JustLouis XIII of France1620–1643||||27 September 1601Château de Fontainebleau son of Henry IV of France and Marie de' Medici||Anne of Spain24 November 16156 children||14 May 1643Parisaged 41
|-
|Louis III the Sun King(Louis XIV of France)1643–1715||||5 September 1638Chateau de Saint-Germain-en-Laye, Kingdom of France son of Louis XIII of France, and Anne of Spain||(1) Maria Theresa of Spain9 June 16603 children(2) Françoise d'Aubigné, Marquise de Maintenon (private)||9 September 1715Palace of Versailles, Franceaged 76
|-
|Louis IV the BelovedLouis XV of France1715–1774||||15 February 1710Palace of Versailles son of Louis, Duke of Burgundy and Marie Adelaide of Savoy||Maria Leszczynska of Poland-Lithuania15 August 172510 children||10 May 1774Palace of Versaillesaged 64
|-
|Louis VLouis XVI of France1774–1793||||23 August 1754Palace of Versailles son of Louis, Dauphin of France and Maria Josepha of Saxony, Dauphine of France||Maria Antonia of Austria19 April 17704 children||21 January 1793Paris, French First Republicaged 38
|-
|}

Restoration

|-
|Louis VII the DesiredLouis XVIII of France(1) 1814–1815 (2) 1815–1824||||9 October 1757Palace of Versailles, Kingdom of France son of Louis, Dauphin of France and Maria Josepha of Saxony||Marie Josephine of Savoy14 May 1771No children||16 September 1824Paris, Kingdom of Franceaged 68
|-
|Charles VCharles X of France1824–1830July Revolution||||17 November 1755Palace of Versailles, Kingdom of France son of Louis, Dauphin of France and Maria Josepha of Saxony||Maria Theresa of Savoy16 November 17734 children||6 November 1836Gorizia, Austrian Empireaged 79
|-
|}

Upper Navarre

House of Trastamara, 1516–1555 

|-
|Joanna III1516–1555||||6 November 1479 daughter of Ferdinand I of Navarre and Isabella of Castile|| Philip, Duke of Burgundy6 children||12 April 1555Tordesillasaged 75
|-
|}

House of Austria, 1516–1700 

|-
|Charles IV1516–1556||||24 February 1500 son of Philip, Duke of Burgundy and Joanna I of Castile||Isabella of Portugal3 children||21 September 1558Yusteaged 58
|-
|Philip IV1556–1598||||21 May 1527 son of Charles IV of Navarre and Isabella of Portugal||Maria Manuela of Portugal1 childMary I of EnglandNo childrenElisabeth of Valois2 childrenAnna of Austria3 children||13 September 1598Escorialaged 71
|-
|Philip V1598–1621||
||14 April 1578 son of Philip IV of Navarra and Anna of Austria||Margaret of Austria5 children||31 March 1621Madridaged 42
|-
|Philip VI1621–1665||
|| 8 April 1605  son of Philip V of Navarra and Margaret of Austria||Elisabeth of Bourbon2 childrenMariana of Austria2 children||17 September 1665Madridaged 60
|-
|Charles V1665–1700||
|| 6 November 1661 son of Philip VI of Navarra and Mariana of Austria||Marie Louise of OrléansNo childrenMaria Anna of NeuburgNo children ||1 November 1700Madridaged 38
|}

House of Bourbon, 1700–1833 

|-
|Philip VII1700–1724||
||19 December 1683 son of Louis Dauphin of France and Maria Anna Victoria of Bavaria||Maria Luisa of Savoy2 childrenElisabeth Farnese6 children||9 July 1746Madridaged 62
|-
|Louis II1724||
|| 25 August 1707  son of Philip VII of Navarre and Maria Luisa of Savoy||Louise Elisabeth of OrléansNo children||31 August 1724Madridaged 17
|-
|Philip VII1724–1746||
||19 December 1683 son of Louis Dauphin of France and Maria Anna Victoria of Bavaria||Maria Luisa of Savoy2 childrenElisabeth Farnese6 children||9 July 1746Madridaged 62
|-
|Ferdinand II1746–1759||
||23 September 1713  son of Philip VII of Navarre and Maria Luisa of Savoy||Barbara of PortugalNo children||10 August 1759Madridaged 45
|-
|Charles VI1759–1788||
||20 January 1716  son of Philip VII of Navarre and Elisabeth Farnese||Maria Amalia of Saxony13 children||14 December 1788Madridaged 72
|-
|Charles VII1788–1808||
||11 November 1748  son of Charles VI of Navarre and Maria Amalia of Saxony||Maria Luisa of Parma14 children||20 January 1819Madridaged 70

|-
|Ferdinand III1808–1833||
||14 October 1784  son of Charles VII of Navarre and Maria Luisa of Parma||Maria Antonia of Naples and SicilyNo childrenMaria Isabel of Portugal2 childrenMaria Josepha Amalia of SaxonyNo childrenMaria Christina of the Two Sicilies2 children||29 September 1833Madridaged 48
|-
|Isabella I18331833 territorial division of Spain||||10 October 1830 daughter of Ferdinand VII of Spain and Maria Christina of Naples and Sicily||Francis of Spain5 children||9 April 1904Paris, French Third Republicaged 73
|-
|}

Regents 

|-
|Don Juan Martinez de Medrano 'El Mayor'Page 464, the Modern Part of a Universal History, From the Earliest Account of Time: The History of Navarre https://books.google.ca/books?id=CE0BAAAAQAAJ&pg=PA464&lpg=PA464&dq=the+history+of+arroniz,+navarre&source=bl&ots=TeFTG8MeUR&sig=ACfU3U0nP8bvgYMza1SuAobl3Ek9fBax0Q&hl=en&sa=X&ved=2ahUKEwiO5v_frb33AhVFCM0KHR_yCd8Q6AF6BAgoEAM#v=onepage&q=the%20history%20of%20arroniz%2C%20navarre&f=false for Joan II of Navarreon 13 March 1328after the death of the last Capetian King of France||||13th Century son of Don Juan Martinez de Medrano||7 children||May 1337-1338 Kingdom of Navarre
|-
|}

|-
|Don Garcia de Medrano y Alvarez de los Rios for King Philip IV of Spainon January 17, 1645 Elected Regent of Navarre and later Regent of the Audience of Seville ||||Navarre, 1604 son of García de Medrano, Lord of San Gregorio, and María Álvarez de los Ríos y Mendoza||Married to María Ignacia de Mendizábal y Uribe1 child||September 3, 1683 Kingdom of Spain
|-
|}

|-
|Don Pedro Antonio Medrano Albelda for King Philip V of SpainOn May 9, 1702 Elected Regent of Navarre||||14 Dec 1642 Calahorra, La Rioja, Spain son of Don Pedro de Medrano Echauz and Josepha de Albelda Barron y Tejada|| Married to Teresa Josefa Alvarez de Arellano Echauz y Velasco1 child||December 1721 Kingdom of Spain Age 71
|-
|}

|-
|Maria Christina of Naples and Sicily for her daughter, Isabella18331833 territorial division of Spain||||27 April 1806 daughter of Francis I of the Two Sicilies and Maria Isabella of Spain||Ferdinand VII of Spain2 children||22 August 1878Le Havre, French Third Republicaged 72
|-
|}

Current claimants
 Prince Pedro, Duke of Calabria is the current heir-general to the kingdom of Navarre, under the kingdom's own laws which allowed female succession, unlike the Salic law of France.
 Louis Alphonse, Duke of Anjou, is the current Legitimist claimant to the kingdoms of France and Navarre. His claim to the Navarrese throne is based on its unification with the French throne under Louis XIII, excluding any subsequent female succession following French succession law. 
Jean, Count of Paris, is the current Orleanist claimant to the kingdoms of France and Navarre. His claim to the Navarrese throne is based on its unification with the French throne under Louis XIII, excluding any subsequent female succession following French succession law.
 Felipe VI of Spain uses the title King of Navarre as part of his more extended titulary, inherited from earlier monarchs of Spain (Castile and Aragon) and based on the conquest of the majority of the ancient kingdom by Ferdinand II of Aragon.
 Sixtus Henry of Bourbon-Parma claims the title King of Navarre as all titles of the Hispanic Monarchy based on the conquest of the ancient kingdom by Ferdinand II of Aragon. He considers himself legitimate successor about the traditional laws of Catholic Monarchy of Spains of Carlos María Isidro.

De facto rulers of Navarre are the King of Spain for Upper Navarre and the French president for Lower Navarre.

See also
 List of Navarrese royal consorts
 Kings of Navarre family tree
 King of Viguera
 List of Spanish monarchs

References

Sources

Navarre, Monarchs
Navarre
Navarrese monarchs
Navarrese royal houses